Cervejaria Petrópolis is a Brazilian brewery (cervejaria) company headquartered in Petrópolis. The company has 6 industrial plants located in Petrópolis, Boituva, Teresópolis, Rondonópolis, Alagoinhas and Itapissuma, and operates in Brazil, Germany and Paraguay.

The company competes with AmBev, Brasil Kirin, Heineken and others. In September 2011, the beers produced by the company took second place in the Brazilian ranking.

Products
The brewery produces a range of beers and other beverages under the brand names Itaipava (Brazil's second-largest selling brand), Crystal, Lokal, Black Princess, Petra and others.

The company produces Nordka vodka, the TNT and Magneto brands of energy drinks and Petra bottled water.

Sponsorships

The company has a number of sports related promotions, supporting its largest selling product, Itaipava beer:
 Itaipava Arena Fonte Nova
 Itaipava São Paulo Indy 300
 Itaipava Arena Pernambuco

See also

 Beer in Brazil

References

External links
Petrópolis
RateBeer

Beer in Brazil
Companies based in Rio de Janeiro (state)